Abu Tavayoj (also Romanized as Abū Ţavayoj, Abū Ţavīj, Abū Ţovayyej, and Abū Ţoveyj) is a village in Abdoliyeh-ye Sharqi Rural District, in the Central District of Ramshir County, Khuzestan Province, Iran. At the 2006 census, its population was 136, in 22 families.

References 

Populated places in Ramshir County